Papilio laglaizei is a swallowtail butterfly found in New Guinea. It is a mimic of Alcides agathyrsus. The larvae feed on Litsea.

laglaizei
Butterflies described in 1877